Rafael Bermúdez (born 13 October 1978 in Montevideo) is a Uruguayan former professional footballer who played as a midfielder in Uruguay, Chile and Oman.

Teams
 Miramar Misiones 1997–2003
 Sud América 2004
 Unión San Felipe 2005
 Al Hilal football club 2009–2010

References
 
 Profile at Tenfield Digital 

Living people
1976 births
Uruguayan footballers
Association football midfielders
Unión San Felipe footballers
Miramar Misiones players
Uruguayan expatriate footballers
Uruguayan expatriate sportspeople in Chile
Expatriate footballers in Chile
Uruguayan expatriate sportspeople in Oman
Expatriate footballers in Oman